The Vârciorova is a right tributary of the river Bistra in Romania. It discharges into the Bistra in Obreja.

References

Rivers of Romania
Rivers of Caraș-Severin County